Wayne Richard Ferreira (born 15 September 1971) is a South African former professional tennis player and current tennis coach.

Career
As a junior player, Ferreira was ranked world no. 1 junior doubles player and no. 6 junior singles player. He won the junior doubles title at the US Open in 1989.

Ferreira turned professional in 1989. He won his first ATP doubles title in Adelaide in 1991.

1992 was Ferreira's breakthrough year on the tour. He started out by reaching the semifinals of the Australian Open. In June he won his first ATP singles title at Queen's Club, London. His second singles title came just a few weeks later at Schenectady, New York. He also teamed-up with compatriot Piet Norval to win the men's doubles silver medal for South Africa at the 1992 Summer Olympics in Barcelona. Ferreira was defeated in the second round in the Olympic singles that year.

After a quieter year in 1993 in which he didn't win any singles titles, Ferreira came back strongly in 1994 to win a career-best five singles titles. He then won another four events in 1995. He competed at the Olympics again in 1996, reaching the quarterfinals in both men's singles and men's doubles, with Ellis Ferreira as his partner. (The two Ferreiras are not related.)

The biggest titles of Ferreira's career came at Toronto in 1996 and Stuttgart in 2000 (both Tennis Masters Series events).

Ferreira teamed-up with Amanda Coetzer in 2000 to win the Hopman Cup for South Africa. He played in his third and final Olympic tournament that year; this time, competing only in singles and being defeated in the first round.

Ferreira is the former record-holder for the most consecutive Grand Slam tournament appearances in men's tennis, having participated in 56 consecutive slams between the 1991 Australian Open and the 2004 US Open. Ferreira's best Grand Slam results came at the Australian Open – where he reached the semi-finals twice in 1992 and 2003.

During his career, Ferreira won 15 top-level singles titles and 11 doubles titles. His career-high rankings were world no. 6 in singles (in May 1995) and world n. 9 in doubles (in March 2001). His career prize-money earnings totalled $9,969,617.

Though Ferreira retired from the professional tour in 2005, he still plays on the Outback Champions Series senior tour. He finished both 2006 and 2007 fourth on points in that series. He is now residing in Lafayette, California. 
Ferreira is currently president and CEO of EcoloBlue, Life and Energy, an environmental and renewable resources corporation based in Miami, Florida, and Lafayette, California.

Ferreira is known for regularly causing upsets against top players. He is one of the few players with a positive record against 20 time Grand Slam champion, Roger Federer. Ferreira teamed up with Federer in the men's doubles at Wimbledon in 2001. They got to the third round and were due to face Donald Johnson and Jared Palmer (the eventual champions) before Federer withdrew to focus on his singles campaign. In addition, Ferreira has a 5-6 head-to-head record against 14 time Grand Slam champion Pete Sampras, with Sampras breaking the tie by winning their final match at the 2002 Canadian Masters. He also holds a positive head-to-head record against multiple Grand Slam champions and former world no. 1 ranked players, including Patrick Rafter, Yevgeny Kafelnikov, John McEnroe, Ivan Lendl and Björn Borg.

Coaching 
Since 2020, Ferreira has been the coach of Frances Tiafoe and became his primary coach after Tiafoe parted ways with former coach Zack Evenden.

Racket
Ferreira played with and endorsed rackets made by Slazenger early in his career. He switched to Dunlop Sport very early in his career and stayed with them, using the 200G racket, until the end of his ATP career.

Career statistics

Olympic games
Finals: 1 (1 silver medal)

Masters Series finals

Singles: 3 (2–1)

Doubles: 12 (6–6)

Career finals

Singles: 23 (15–8)

Singles performance timeline

1Held as Stockholm Masters until 1994, Essen Masters in 1995, Stuttgart Masters 1996–2001, Madrid Masters from 2002–08.

Doubles: 24 (11–13)

Doubles performance timeline

Senior Tour championships
2007– defeated Jim Courier 2–6, 6–3, [11–9] in the Stanford Championships
2007– defeated Aaron Krickstein 6–3, 6–3 in The Oliver Group Champions Cup

Top 10 wins

References

External links
 
 
 

Hopman Cup competitors
Olympic medalists in tennis
Olympic silver medalists for South Africa
Olympic tennis players of South Africa
Tennis players from Johannesburg
People from Lafayette, California
South African expatriates in the United States
South African male tennis players
South African tennis coaches
South African people of Portuguese descent
Tennis players at the 1992 Summer Olympics
Tennis players at the 1996 Summer Olympics
Tennis players at the 2000 Summer Olympics
US Open (tennis) junior champions
White South African people
1971 births
Living people
Medalists at the 1992 Summer Olympics
Alumni of Parktown Boys' High School
Grand Slam (tennis) champions in boys' doubles